Clovis is a city in Fresno County, California, United States. Clovis was established in 1890 as a freight stop for the San Joaquin Valley Railroad by a group of Fresno businessmen and Michigan railroad speculator Marcus Pollasky. The railroad bought the land from two farmers and named the station after one of them, Clovis Cole. Pollasky then developed a town on the site, also named Clovis. 

The completion of the lumber flume in 1894 led to the growth of the area around Clovis Station where a lumberyard and sawmill were built. Clovis was officially incorporated as a city in 1912. Today, Clovis celebrates its heritage as an American frontier town, known for its rodeo, Old Town Clovis historic district, and its motto "Clovis – A Way of Life."

The 2020 population was 120,124.

History

The city of Clovis began as a freight stop along the San Joaquin Valley Railroad. Organized on January 15, 1890, by Fresno businessmen Thomas E. Hughes, Fulton Berry, Gilbert R. Osmun, H.D. Colson, John D. Gray, and William M. Williams, in partnership with Michigan railroad speculator Marcus Pollasky, the SJVRR began construction in Fresno on July 4, 1891, and reached the farmlands of Clovis M. Cole and George Owen by October of that year. The railroad purchased right-of-way from both farmers, half from each – the east side from Cole and the west side from Owen – and ran tracks up the borderline between the two properties. The railroad agreed to establish a station on the west side of the tracks and to call it "Clovis." The Clovis station, which was named after Clovis Cole, was positioned on the Owen side of the track.

Cole and Owen later sold land to Marcus Pollasky for the development of a townsite. Fresno civil engineer Ingvart Tielman mapped the townsite on behalf of Pollasky on December 29, 1891. The original townsite featured streets named for the officers and principal investors of the railroad: (Benjamin) Woodworth, (Marcus) Pollasky, Fulton (Berry), (Thomas) Hughes, (Gerald) Osmun, and (O. D.) Baron. The townsite, named "Clovis" after Clovis Station by Pollasky, was laid out on what was originally Owen's land.

The railroad was completed as far as the town of Hamptonville (now Friant) on the banks of the San Joaquin River, just  from its point of origin in Fresno. Articles of Incorporation for the San Joaquin Valley Railroad indicate that the corporation intended to build  of track, including sidings and spurs, through the agricultural acreage east of Fresno, then north to the timber and mineral resources of the Sierra foothills. At the time, Hamptonville was called "Pollasky". A celebration of the completion of track-laying was held at the Pollasky terminus on the Wednesday before Thanksgiving of 1891 with a reported 3,000 Fresnans attending. The railroad began official operation in January 1892.

The first year of operation of the railroad coincided with the beginnings of a deep national economic decline. Farmers were unable to get a profitable return on their crops, banks and railroads failed nationwide. The SJVRR was unable to generate sufficient revenues to pay its debt, was leased to the Southern Pacific Railroad and subsequently bought by SPRR in 1893. By reducing the railroad's schedule of operation and trimming costs, the Southern Pacific was able to turn a small profit in the first years after its acquisition.

A dam was built across Stevenson Creek to create a lake that would enable them to move freshly cut timber to a mill beside the lake. As lumber was rough-cut at the mill, it was loaded into the flume and propelled by water to a planing mill east of the Clovis railroad station, where the Clovis Rodeo and Clark Intermediate School sit today. The lumber mill and yard had its own network of rails to move lumber around the yard and to connect with the SJVRR just south of Clovis station.

The completion in 1894 of the lumber flume and commencement of mill operations provided the impetus for further development of the area around the Clovis Station. The town began to take shape as lumber yard employees built homes close to their employment. Service businesses, churches, and schools became necessary, and the town was begun. Clovis's first post office opened in 1895. An 1896 newspaper article describes the town as having a population approaching 500 citizens.

Clovis was incorporated as a city in February 1912. Principal streets in the town center were named for the railroad's officers. Fulton Street was later named Front Street, then Main Street, and is now Clovis Avenue.

The lumber mill burned in 1914 and was not rebuilt. The grounds are now occupied by Clark Intermediate School and the Clovis Rodeo Grounds. Clovis has a long history as a western town known for its slogan, "Clovis – A Way of Life". Since 1914, the Clovis Rodeo has been held on the last weekend in April, with a parade on Saturday morning, followed by the rodeo that afternoon and all day Sunday. Also contributing to the "Clovis way of life" are a number of street festivals, including Big Hat Days, ClovisFest, and the weekly Friday Night Farmer's Market held between mid-May and mid-September every year.

The last surviving structure built by the railroad is a depot now located near the site of the original Clovis Station. The earliest photos, from about 1910, show the depot situated in front of the Tarpey winery south of the intersection of Ashlan and Clovis Avenues. In 1999 it was moved to its present location in the town's center, at the northeast corner of Clovis Avenue and Fourth Street, and was restored by the Clovis Big Dry Creek Historical Society with financing, labor, and materials donated by local businesses and contractors.

Marcus Pollasky was a lawyer, born in Michigan, living in Chicago just before he came to Fresno. Throughout his life he tried to create several projects similar to the SJVRR, including projects in Eureka, California, Virginia, Michigan, and Oklahoma. Few were ever actually built. In 1896, Pollasky sued Collis P. Huntington in Los Angeles courts over the money he lost in Fresno, "while engaged in a joint venture with the defendant, Huntington". It has long been speculated that Pollasky was an agent of the Southern Pacific, and this "joint venture" suit seems to prove that point.

Many buildings in the town core have been renovated. Older storefronts on Clovis Avenue, the main street running through town, have been restored and new buildings have been designed with facades that resemble those found in the early 20th century. The historic center has been reborn as "Old Town Clovis".

Geography

According to the United States Census Bureau, the city has a total area of 23.28 square miles (60.29 km2), all of it land.

Clovis is situated midway between Los Angeles and San Francisco, bordering Fresno, in the agriculturally rich San Joaquin Valley. Lying at the foot of the Sierra Nevada Mountain Range, which includes Yosemite, Kings Canyon, and Sequoia National Parks, Clovis has been known as "Gateway to the Sierras" since its incorporation in 1912.

The formation of alluvial fans in this part of the San Joaquin Valley has led to a rather flat regional geography. The Clovis area has active and potentially active seismic fault zones. The groundwater flow in Clovis is generally to the southwest.

Demographics

2010
At the 2010 census Clovis had a population of 95,631. The racial makeup of Clovis was 67,758 (70.9%) White, 2,618 (2.7%) African American, 1,320 (1.4%) Native American, 10,233 (10.7%) Asian, 218 (0.2%) Pacific Islander, 8,857 (9.3%) from other races, and 4,627 (4.8%) from two or more races. Hispanic or Latino of any race were 24,514 persons (25.6%).

The census reported that 95,243 people (99.6% of the population) lived in households, 130 (0.1%) lived in non-institutionalized group quarters, and 258 (0.3%) were institutionalized.

There were 33,419 households, 13,718 (41.0%) had children under the age of 18 living in them, 17,975 (53.8%) were opposite-sex married couples living together, 4,554 (13.6%) had a female householder with no husband present, 1,889 (5.7%) had a male householder with no wife present. There were 1,985 (5.9%) unmarried opposite-sex partnerships, and 198 (0.6%) same-sex married couples or partnerships. 7,008 households (21.0%) were one person and 2,721 (8.1%) had someone living alone who was 65 or older. The average household size was 2.85. There were 24,418 families (73.1% of households); the average family size was 3.32.

The age distribution was 26,851 people (28.1%) under the age of 18, 9,572 people (10.0%) aged 18 to 24, 25,542 people (26.7%) aged 25 to 44, 23,559 people (24.6%) aged 45 to 64, and 10,107 people (10.6%) who were 65 or older. The median age was 34.1 years. For every 100 females, there were 93.2 males. For every 100 females age 18 and over, there were 89.5 males.

There were 35,306 housing units at an average density of ,of which 33,419 were occupied, 20,804 (62.3%) by the owners and 12,615 (37.7%) by renters.  The homeowner vacancy rate was 2.3%; the rental vacancy rate was 6.4%. 60,767 people (63.5% of the population) lived in owner-occupied housing units and 34,476 people (36.1%) lived in rental housing units.

2000
At the 2000 census there were 68,468 people in 24,347 households, including 17,675 families, in the city. The racial makeup of the city was 75.8% White, 1.9% Black or African American, 1.5% Native American, 6.5% Asian, 0.2% Pacific Islander, 9.5% from other races, and 4.6% from two or more races. 20.3% of the population were Hispanic or Latino of any race.
Of the 24,347 households 41.7% had children under the age of 18 living with them, 54.4% were married couples living together, 13.2% had a female householder with no husband present, and 27.4% were non-families. 22.3% of households were one person and 8.1% were one person aged 65 or older. The average household size was 2.79 and the average family size was 3.29.

The age distribution was 30.7% under the age of 18, 9.2% from 18 to 24, 30.4% from 25 to 44, 20.4% from 45 to 64, and 9.4% 65 or older. The median age was 33 years. For every 100 females, there were 92.3 males. For every 100 females age 18 and over, there were 88.2 males.

The median income for a household in the city was $42,283, and the median family income  was $50,859. Males had a median income of $39,630 versus $28,072 for females. The per capita income for the city was $18,690. About 7.6% of families and 10.6% of the population were below the poverty line, including 13.1% of those under age 18 and 7.1% of those age 65 or over.

Economy

Top employers

According to the city's 2020 Comprehensive Annual Financial Report, the top employers in the city are:

Cityscape 
The Sierra Vista Mall is a  enclosed regional shopping center anchored by Target, Kohl's,Sierra Vista Cinemas 16, and MB2 Indoor Raceway.

Public transportation within the city is provided by Clovis Transit; some areas also are served by Fresno Area Express, providing connections to Fresno.

Education

Clovis Unified School District

Elementary schools:
Boris, Bud Rank, Cedarwood, Century, Clovis, Cole, Copper Hills, Cox, Dry Creek, Fancher Creek, Fort Washington, Freedom, Fugman, Garfield, Gettysburg, Jefferson, Liberty, Lincoln, Maple Creek, Mickey Cox, Miramonte, Mountain View, Nelson, Pinedale, Red Bank, Reagan Elementary, Riverview, Sierra Vista, Tarpey, Temperance-Kutner, Valley Oak, Weldon, Harold L. Woods, Red Bank
Middle schools:
Clark Intermediate, Kastner Intermediate, Alta Sierra Intermediate, Reyburn Intermediate, Granite Ridge Intermediate
High schools:
Buchanan High School, Clovis East High School, Clovis High School, Clovis West High School, Clovis North High School, Enterprise High School, Excel High School, Gateway High School

Colleges
 Clovis Community College
 San Joaquin College of Law
 California Health Sciences University College of Osteopathic Medicine
 California Health Sciences University College of Pharmacy

Public libraries
Fresno County Public Library operates the Clovis Regional Library.

Notable people

Ryan Beatty, pop singer
Connor Brogdon (born 1995), Philadelphia Phillies baseball player
Tyler Clutts, former NFL fullback, attended Clovis High, class of 2003
Chris Colfer, singer, actor and author, best known for portraying the role of Kurt Hummel on Glee and Land of Stories book series.
Terry Cooney, American League umpire, 1974–92
Colby Covington, mixed martial artist, former UFC Interim Welterweight Champion
Zubin Damania, MD, founder of Turntable Health, a direct primary care clinic in Las Vegas
Bryson DeChambeau, 2020 U.S. Open golf champion
Jason Donald, former MLB infielder
Jordan Feliz, Christian pop singer/songwriter
Zack Follett, former linebacker for the Detroit Lions; attended Clovis High
Matt Giordano, American football safety who is currently a physical education teacher at Buchanan High School 
Aaron Hill, actor, best known for his work on the ABC Family TV show, Greek
Valarie Kaur, documentary filmmaker, civil rights activist, and Sikh interfaith leader
Eric Kendricks, linebacker for the Minnesota Vikings
Daryle Lamonica, former quarterback for the Buffalo Bills and Oakland Raiders
Alysa Liu, figure skater
Sam Long (born 1995), San Francisco Giants baseball player
Mary Loveless, immunologist
Kendall Milton, college football player for the Georgia Bulldogs
Garrett Olson, former MLB pitcher; attended Buchanan High
Jenna Prandini, track and field athlete and Olympian 
Aaron Ruell, Kip in Napoleon Dynamite
Larissa Schuster, convicted murderer
 Kate Scott, sportscaster, play-by-play announcer for the Philadelphia 76ers
John Taylor, former wide receiver for the San Francisco 49ers
Jason Von Flue, professional mixed martial artist; UFC and The Ultimate Fighter, season 2 veteran
Justin Wilson, professional MLB pitcher for the Cincinnati Reds, attended Buchanan High

See also

Burrough Valley
Tollhouse, California
Shaver Lake

References

External links

Clovis Chamber of Commerce

 
Cities in Fresno County, California
Incorporated cities and towns in California
Populated places established in 1890
1890 establishments in California